The 2013 World Pool Masters, also known as World Pool Masters XXI, was a nine-ball pool tournament that took place in Barnsley, England, between 25 and 27 October 2013. It was the 21st edition of the invitational tournament organised by Matchroom Sport. Netherlands' Niels Feijen won the event, defeating Darren Appleton in the final 8–6.

Defending champion Ralf Souquet lost his first round match to Chris Melling 8–3.

Event prize money

Tournament bracket

References

External links

2013
World Pool Masters
World Pool Masters
World Pool Masters
Sport in Barnsley
World Pool Masters